Adam B. Resnick (born March 10, 1972) is an American health care entrepreneur, public speaker, author, and professional whistleblower. His 2007 book, Bust: How I Gambled and Lost a Fortune, Brought Down a Bank-and Lived to Pay for It, is an autobiography describing his early addiction to gambling and how he, in a bank fraud conspiracy, contributed to the 2002 failure of Universal Federal Savings Bank in Chicago, Illinois. Resnick was convicted for his role in the fraud and served 19 months in federal prison. His life story has been discussed as the subject for a motion picture, documentary or television mini-series.

Resnick has since played a significant part in exposing Medicare and Medicaid fraud in the institutional pharmaceutical business.

Omnicare whistleblower lawsuits
Resnick has been involved in suing Omnicare, a supplier of drugs to nursing homes, under federal whistleblower law, as well as the parties to the company's alleged kickback schemes. Resnick filed suit to punish Omnicare for Medicare and Medicaid fraud. Omnicare allegedly paid kickbacks to nursing home operators in order to secure additional business.

"If nursing homes take kickbacks, decisions they make about drugs for their residents ultimately may be based on financial benefits to the nursing homes rather than medical benefits for their patients," Resnick said after a settlement was reached in 2010 with two nursing chains he sued.

Mariner Health Care &  SavaSeniorCare Administrative Services
In 2006, Resnick filed a lawsuit under the False Claims Act against Omnicare and two nursing homes owned by Leonard Grunstein and Rubin Schron. The U.S. Department of Justice joined the lawsuit in December 2008, and Omnicare settled by paying $19.8 million to the federal government in November 2010. Omnicare denied any wrongdoing.
Subsequently, the two nursing homes also charged in the lawsuit, Mariner Health Care Inc. and SavaSeniorCare Administrative Services L.L.C., paid $14 million in February 2010 to settle their part in the alleged fraud. The two nursing home chains allegedly solicited kickbacks from Omnicare in exchange for 15-year contracts to utilize Omnicare's pharmacy services.

Total Pharmacy Services
In June 2013, Omnicare settled its part of a whistleblower lawsuit filed against it by Resnick and Maureen Nehls related to its 2004 acquisition of Total Pharmacy Services. Sued for illegally paying kickbacks to the owners of Total Pharmacy, Omnicare agreed to settle the suit by paying $17.2 million to the federal government.

Nursing home owners the Esformes family, who sold their share in Total Pharmacy to Omnicare in return for the kickback, agreed to pay the government $5 million. Total Pharmacy provides pharmacy services to institutions such as nursing homes. The terms of the acquisition were in violation of federal and state laws.

Omnicare previously settled a complaint with the Commonwealth of Massachusetts stemming from the deal for $98 million.

Nehls was a vice president of Total Pharmacy and Resnick was to the deal eir 2007 lawsuit alleged that the price paid by Omnicare for Total, $32 million, as greatly inflated by the kickback paid to the Esformes family. As part of the deal, the Esformes family signed a 10-year  pharmacy contract with Omnicare for their chain of nursing homes. Such kickbacks constitute Medicare and Medicaid fraud.
  
Under federal whistleblower laws, the plaintiffs will receive 28% of the Omnicare recovery (worth roughly $4.8 million) and 25-30% of the recovery from the Esformes family (worth from $1.25 million to $1.5 million). The Esformes family also agreed to pay almost  $1 million in the plaintiffs’ attorneys' fees.

The settlement, which was reached days before suit was scheduled to go to trial, did not include an admission of wrongdoing by the Esformes family.

Restitution
In 2009, Resnick, decided to use a substantial part of his $3.1 million award from his first Omnicare whistleblower lawsuit to pay restitution to the U.S. government for his role in the 2002 Universal Federal Savings Bank failure. Through an unprecedented arrangement worked out by the Federal Deposit Insurance Corporation, Resnick's restitution was forwarded to Universal's former employees and depositors. Not only has everyone who lost money when the bank failed been made whole, but, as the Chicago Journal reported, Resnick's restitution is also being given to “regular bank customers who didn’t lose a penny when Universal collapsed.” The FDIC says this case marks the first time in history that the U.S. government has received restitution money after it had closed receivership on a failed bank.

Malpractice lawsuit
Resnick also sued the Chicago law firm of Neal, Gerber and Eisenberg for legal malpractice over a multi-million dollar contract dispute alleging that they represented both Resnick and the contracting party. The $20 million dispute was settled in an out of court settlement through arbitration.

Awards and recognitions 
In 2006, Resnick was presented with a Lifting Up the World with a Oneness-Heart Award by Chinmoy Centres International for his “dedication to international development charities."

Writings
The Chicago Sun-Times called Resnick's book, Bust: How I Gambled and Lost a Fortune, Brought Down a Bank-and Lived to Pay for It, “entertaining.” The Milwaukee Journal Sentinel called it a “wild ride.”

Resnick is also the author of numerous articles and editorials, including
"For Addicts, House Holds Chips." Chicago Tribune, Dec. 20, 2009.
"A Second Chance for Felons." Denver Post, Feb. 14, 2010.
"With Obamacare Passed, Let's Address Fraud and Waste." Washington Examiner, March 24, 2010.
"The Bet America Needs to Make." Las Vegas Review-Journal, Sept. 26, 2010.
"Whistling Over the Cliff." Huffington Post, Nov. 19, 2012.
"Washington's New Odd Couple." International Business Times, Dec. 27, 2012.
"Fish and Eggs on Wall Street." San Francisco Chronicle, Dec. 27, 2012.
"Debtors' Prison In Las Vegas." International Business Times, Jan. 4, 2013.
"A Second Chance for Lance Armstrong." International Business Times, Jan. 10, 2013.
"A Billion Lessons in Addiction." San Diego Union-Tribune, Feb. 15, 2013.
"The Year of the Whistleblower." Tampa Tribune, Feb. 20, 2013.
"A New Low In America: College Athletics Benefiting From Criminals." International Business Times, Feb. 22, 2013.
"A Second Chance for Empathy." Huffington Post, April 1, 2013.
"SEC's Turnstile."Huffington Post, April 22, 2013.
"The Real IRS Opprobrium."Huffington Post, May 21, 2013.
"Braun's Chance for Real Brawn." Huffington Post, July 24, 2013.
"Lawyer Jokes -- Humor or Reality?" Huffington Post, August 14, 2013.

References

Additional sources
 US Department of Justice indictment announcement
 Dateline NBC feature on Adam Resnick
 Recovering Addict-Businessman Helps Government Recover Millions from Omnicare for Nursing Home Kickback Scheme - PRNewswire
 Prominent New York City Real Estate Investor, Attorney and Atlanta Nursing Home Chains Pay $14 Million to Settle Whistleblower Kickback Case - PRNewswire

Living people
1972 births
American whistleblowers
21st-century American businesspeople
American businesspeople convicted of crimes
Place of birth missing (living people)